Energy4All facilitates the creation and development of community energy in the United Kingdom, based on the experience gained in the creation of the UK's first wind co-op, Baywind Energy Co-operative. It has gone on to raise over £40m on behalf of the co-operatives and community benefit societies through community share offerings.

Energy4All is a private limited company established in 2002 that has helped create 24 community energy projects, including Westmill Wind Farm Co-operative and Boyndie Wind Farm Co-operative, who, along with Baywind, own Energy4All.

One of the co-operatives it has created, Energy Prospects Co-operative, specialises in taking early stage co-operatives through the development and planning application stages to the point where a community share offer, managed by Energy4All, can be launched to fund the project.

Energy4All won an Ashden Award in 2012.

Energy4All was elected to Board of REScoop the European Federation of renewable energy cooperatives in 2017 and is a participant in the MECISE  project to develop a European cooperative energy investment fund.

See also
Wind power in the United Kingdom
Community wind energy

References

External links
energy4all.co.uk

Community electricity generation in the United Kingdom
Co-operatives in England
Energy cooperatives
Wind power companies of England